Ian McIntyre (born 1972) is the coach of the Syracuse Orange men's soccer team. He previously coached at Oneonta and Hartwick.

Early life
McIntyre grew up in Basildon, England and played for an Arsenal FC youth team.

Playing career
McIntyre was a sweeper for the Hartwick Hawks from 1992–1995. The team had a 50–20–7 record during his four seasons as a player.  The team also made 2 NCAA Tournament berths and a 52-20-7 record during his four seasons. McIntyre was named to the NSCAA All-American First Team in 1995. In that same year, he was named the Hartwick Male Athlete of the Year.  He was inducted into the Hartwick College Athletic Hall of Fame in 2001, his first year of eligibility.

Coaching career
McIntyre began his coaching career at Fairfield University as an assistant coach from 1996-98 under former Hartwick assistant coach Carl Rees. During his time, the team had two consecutive Metro Atlantic Athletic Conference championship game appearances.

In 1998, he was hired as the head coach at Oneonta State and coached there until 2002. In 2003, his alma mater, Hartwick hired him as head coach. 

After seven seasons at Hartwick, McIntyre was hired on as the head coach at Syracuse University by AD Daryl Gross. McIntyre inherited a struggling program from Dean Foti, who had coached at Syracuse from 1991–2009. The year before McIntyre took over, the Orange finished 3–15. In his first year, the team continued to struggle, posting a 2–10–5 record. However, McIntyre has led the team to great improvements in the following 5 years, winning an ACC Championship in 2015 and making several NCAA Tournament appearances. As of 2023, 19 players coached by McIntyre have been drafted to the MLS since 2010.

Ian McIntyre has brought the Orange to the 2022 National Championship, two NCAA Tournament College Cup in 2015 and 2022, and two ACC Conference Titles in 2015 and 2022. McIntyre was named the National College Coach of the Year in 2022, the ACC Coach of the Year in 2014 and 2022, and the Big East Coach of the Year in 2012.

Honors & Awards
 2022 NCAA Division I National Champions
 2022 United Soccer Coaches College Coach of the Year
 2022 NSCAA/USC South Region Coach of the Year 
 2022 ACC Coach of the Year
 2022 ACC Atlantic Division Regular Season Champions
 2022 ACC men's soccer tournament Champions
 2015 ACC men's soccer tournament Champions
 2014 ACC Coach of the Year
 2014 NSCAA/USC South Region Coach of the Year 
 2014 ACC Atlantic Division Regular Season Champions
 2012 BIG EAST Coaching Staff of the Year
 2005 Atlantic Soccer Conference Coach of the Year
 2004 NSCAA New York Region Coach of the Year
 1999 Independent Coach of the Year

Head coaching record

References

External links
Syracuse Bio
Hartwick Hall of Fame
McIntyre on 'Cuse Conversations Podcast in 2023

Living people
Syracuse Orange men's soccer coaches
Hartwick Hawks men's soccer players
Hartwick College alumni
English football managers
Year of birth uncertain
Association football defenders
Sportspeople from Basildon
English footballers
English expatriate footballers
English expatriate football managers
English expatriate sportspeople in the United States
Expatriate soccer managers in the United States
Expatriate soccer players in the United States
1972 births